The Tar Heel Sports Network is a radio network in the United States dedicated to broadcasting live events and programming relating to North Carolina Tar Heels athletics.  It is operated by Tar Heel Sports Properties, a property of LEARFIELD, which manages the multimedia rights for the University of North Carolina at Chapel Hill.  The Network's flagship station is WPTF in Raleigh, North Carolina.

The network began in the early 1960s when WSOC in Charlotte made the first attempt to create a radio network for Tar Heel men's basketball outside the Triangle.  In 1965, WSOC owner Cox Broadcasting sold the network to  Village Broadcasting, owner of  WCHL in Chapel Hill, North Carolina. WCHL became the flagship station. Village Broadcasting gradually evolved into VilCom, and sold the network in the late 1990s.

The Network consists mainly of local radio affiliates within North Carolina, southern Virginia, and northern South Carolina.  Some stations with local interest carry only football or basketball programming.  For example, WAMW-FM of Washington, Indiana, the hometown of Tyler Zeller, aired men's basketball from 2009 to 2012.

The Network's play-by-play announcer for football and men's basketball games was Woody Durham from 1971 until his retirement in 2011.  Jones Angell succeeded Durham as "the Voice of the Tar Heels" for both football and basketball beginning with the 2011 football season.  

From 1989-2005, former Carolina Panthers play-by-play announcer Mick Mixon served as the color analyst. Current analyst duties are split between Eric Montross (basketball) and Brian Simmons (football) with Lee Pace handling football sideline reporting.

UNC head coaches Mack Brown (football), Scott Forbes (baseball), Courtney Banghart (women's basketball), and Hubert Davis (men's basketball) host programs on the Network during their respective team's season.

The state's most powerful AM station, WBT in Charlotte, has been an affiliate of the network since 1971, except for 1991 to 1995 and 2006 to 2012.  WBT is a 50,000-watt clear-channel station that reaches parts of 22 states at night, bringing the Tar Heels' broadcasts to most of the eastern half of North America.  According to longtime WBT station manager Cullie Tarleton, putting the Tar Heels on WBT was largely the idea of longtime coach Dean Smith, who wanted to tell recruits from New England that their parents would be able to listen to the games. Beginning in 2006, WFNZ served as the network's Charlotte outlet. However, its weaker nighttime signal forced the Tar Heels to contract first with WRFX (2006-2011) and WNOW-FM (2011-2012) to simulcast football games that kicked off after 5 p.m., as well as all basketball games.  The Tar Heels returned to WBT beginning with the 2012 football season.

In 2021, North Carolina's second-most-powerful AM station, WPTF, joined the network. As part of the deal, WPTF became the network's flagship, though WCHL remains as an affiliate station. WPTF had long been the flagship of rival NC State from 1968 to 2008.

List of affiliates

Current network stations

External links
List of affiliates from the Tar Heel Times

References

North Carolina Tar Heels
Sports radio networks in the United States
University of North Carolina at Chapel Hill media
College basketball on the radio in the United States
College football on the radio
Learfield IMG College sports radio networks